Love Beyond Frontier may refer to:
 Love Beyond Frontier (2008 TV series), a Thai drama television series 
 Love Beyond Frontier (2019 TV series), a Thai television series remake of the above